Nemyriv is a historic town in Vinnytsia Oblast (province) in Ukraine, located in the historical region of Podolia. It was the administrative center of former Nemyriv Raion (district). Population: 

Nemyriv is one of the oldest cities in Vinnytska oblast, Ukraine. It was founded by Prince Nemyr in 1390. It is a minor industrial center.

The distiller company that produces Ukrainian Nemiroff (Russian spelling) vodka is located in Nemyriv.

The town's tourist attractions include a late 19th-century palace (which belonged to the House of Potocki) and a park complex.

History

Nemyriv was built on the site of ancient Scythian settlement Myriv, destroyed during the Mongol invasion of Rus'. It was first mentioned under its modern name in 1506, which ultimately derives from the Slavic given name Niemir. It was a private town of Poland, owned by the families of Zbaraski and Potocki. Polish King Stanisław August Poniatowski visited the Potocki Palace.

Notable events of Cossack wars took place in the town through 17th century and the city was captured by Andrii Abazyn between 1702 and 1704.

In 1737, an abortive congress was held in Nemyriv, aimed at the conclusion of peace between the emperors of Russia, Austria-Hungary, and Ottoman Turkey, and bringing an end to the Russo-Turkish War of 1735–39.

Jewish history of the city
Before World War II, Nemyriv had a large Jewish community. During the Khmelnytsky Uprising a massacre of Jews took place in Nemyriv. The town fell to the Cossacks on 10 June 1648, and the non-Jewish townspeople betrayed the Jews to the Cossacks. The massacre was significant enough to Polish-Lithuanian Jewry that the Council of Four Lands marked the Jewish date of the massacre, 20 Sivan, as a day of remembrance for all the dead from the Khmelnytsky Uprising. The Hasidic Rabbi Jacob Joseph of Polonne was appointed as rabbi in Nemyriv after he left Rashkov, during the 3rd quarter of the 18th century. By the 19th century it had become one of the centers of Breslov Hasidism, being the birthplace and home of Nathan of Breslov ("Reb Noson"), the foremost disciple and scribe of rebbe Nachman of Breslov. After Nachman's death in 1810, Reb Noson moved to Bratslav to disseminate and publish his teachings from there. The city acted as a center of Jewish studies and linked with several Rabbi.Yom-Tov Lipmann Heller and Jehiel Michel ben Eliezer. Yom-Tov Lipmann Heller once chief Rabbi of Vienna and Prague was the Chief Rabbi of Nemyriv from 1631 to 1634.

By September 1941, the German kept the Jews of the city prisoners in a ghetto, where they were put to work, constructing the road from Nemyriv to Gaysin. On November 24, 1941, an Einsatzgruppen massacred 2,680 Jews in pits in the Polish cemetery. On June 26, 1942, the ghetto was liquidated. The Jews were driven into the synagogue, where 200 to 300 young and strong men and women were selected and sent to a labor camp. The rest, perhaps as many as 500, were shot behind the Polish cemetery in pits that had been dug in advance.

Gallery

Notable people
 Nathan of Breslov, rabbi
 Nikolay Nekrasov, poet
 Marko Vovchok, writer
 Theodosius Dobzhansky, geneticist
 Mordechai Namir, Israeli politician
 Ida Rhodes (birth name Hadassah Itzkowitz) was born in a Jewish village between Nemyriv and Tulchyn.
 Yosyf Semashko, Uniate and Orthodox hierarch

References

External links
 The murder of the Jews of Nemyriv during World War II, at Yad Vashem website.

 
Cities of district significance in Ukraine
Cities in Vinnytsia Oblast
Bratslav Voivodeship
Bratslavsky Uyezd
Shtetls
Holocaust locations in Ukraine